Disaster psychiatry is a field of psychiatry. It is closely linked to military psychiatry and largely evolved from that field, but has a focus that is broader than a purely military context, and that may include natural disasters, large accidents, public health emergencies, and their community-wide disruptions and mental health implications. Disaster psychiatry has a "vital role in the evolving structures for preparedness and response in the fields of disaster management."

References

Military psychiatry
Emergency management